Andrei Igorevich Gorbanets (born 24 August 1985) is a Russian football player. He plays for Kosmos Dolgoprudny.

Club career
He made his debut in the Russian Premier League in 2005 for FC Saturn Moscow Oblast.

External links
 
 Profile on the FC Rubin Kazan site 
 

1985 births
Living people
Russian footballers
Association football midfielders
FC Saturn Ramenskoye players
FC Rubin Kazan players
FC Krasnodar players
Russian Premier League players
FC Sibir Novosibirsk players
FC Mordovia Saransk players
FC Tom Tomsk players
FC Ural Yekaterinburg players
FC Arsenal Tula players
FC Taraz players
Russian expatriate footballers
Expatriate footballers in Kazakhstan
FC Rotor Volgograd players
FC Olimp-Dolgoprudny players